Buttar Kalan is a village in Moga district of East Punjab (India) located on the Moga-Barnala highway. Khurd and Kalan are Persian words meaning "small" and "big", respectively. When two villages have same name, they are differentiated by adding "Khurd" or "Kalan" to their names.

Culture and People 

Punjabi is the mother tongue as well as the official language of the village, predominated by the Jatt people of Buttar clan. Genetic studies conducted of this area confirm steady amounts of West Asian ancestry and detectable levels of Dravidian influences in the population. As in other parts of Punjab,  skin color ranges from almost white to almost black in Buttar, however, the most common skin colors are medium brown and dark brown. Exposure to the sun accounts for the darker complexion of Jat farmworkers. As a rule, the hair color is almost always dark brown and frequently curly in texture. However, traces of blondism in hair and eye color are present in small percentages.

Religion 
Currently the village is predominated by the Sikhs.

History
Buttar is very old village in the area that was established during Vedic times by Central Asian immigrants. This village had its very first secondary school in early years, loads of people from around villages used to come for their study in this village. There are  many political celebrities form this village.S.Gurmit Singh Dhillon is a respected ex-Sarpanch, who served selflessly till 1997. buttar is turning into shape of large town nowadays but it had split into two parts by panchayati department and now it is known by dhillon buttar, and bhullar buttar. buttar has held tournament every year for youngsters and others. Three-fourths of the people from this village live abroad in places such as Canada, USA, Australia and many other countries.

See also 
Buttar, the Jatt clan
Buttar Kalan, Gurdaspur
Buttar Sarinh
Kokri Buttran

References 

Villages in Moga district